Simone Carafa Roccella, C.R. (died 22 March 1676) was a Roman Catholic prelate who served as Archbishop of Messina (1647–1676) and Archbishop of Acerenza e Matera (1638–1647).

Biography
Simone Carafa Roccella was ordained a priest in the Congregation of Clerics Regular of the Divine Providence.
On 30 August 1638, he was appointed during the papacy of Pope Urban VIII as Archbishop of Acerenza e Matera.
On 12 September 1638, he was consecrated bishop by Francesco Maria Brancaccio, Cardinal-Priest of Santi XII Apostoli, with Tommaso Carafa, Bishop Emeritus of Vulturara e Montecorvino, and Giovanni Battista Altieri, Bishop Emeritus of Camerino, serving as co-consecrators.
On 14 May 1647, he was selected as Archbishop of Messina and confirmed by Pope Innocent X on 16 September 1647.
He served as Archbishop of Messina until his death on 22 March 1676.

References

External links and additional sources
 (for Chronology of Bishops) 
 (for Chronology of Bishops 
 (for Chronology of Bishops) 
 (for Chronology of Bishops)  

17th-century Roman Catholic bishops in Sicily
Bishops appointed by Pope Urban VIII
Bishops appointed by Pope Innocent X
1676 deaths
Theatine bishops
17th-century Italian Roman Catholic archbishops